Plaza Catedral is a 2021 Panamanian drama film directed by Abner Benaim. It was selected as the Panamanian entry for the Best International Feature Film at the 94th Academy Awards. The film appeared on the Best International Feature Film shortlist in December 2021.

Young actor Fernando Xavier de Casta received the Mezcal Award for Best Actor from the Guadalajara International Film Festival, but was shot to death in Panama before the film was released internationally.

Cast
 Manolo Cardona as Diego
 Ilse Salas as Alicia
 Fernando Xavier De Casta as Chief

Accolades 

|-
| align = "center" rowspan = "3" | 2022 || rowspan = "3" | 9th Platino Awards || Best Actress || Ilse Salas ||  || rowspan = "3" | 
|-
| Best Screenplay || Abner Benaim ||  
|-
| Best Sound || Carlos García || 
|}

See also
 List of submissions to the 94th Academy Awards for Best International Feature Film
 List of Panamanian submissions for the Academy Award for Best International Feature Film

References

External links
 

2021 films
2021 drama films
Panamanian drama films
2020s Spanish-language films